The 1999–2000 season was Real Sociedad's 91st season in existence and the club's 33rd consecutive season in the top flight of Spanish football. In addition to the domestic league, Real Sociedad participated in this season's edition of the Copa del Rey. The season covers the period from 1 July 1999 to 30 June 2000.

Head coach Bernd Krauss was dismissed after nine matches due to poor results and replaced by Javier Clemente two days later.

Pre-season and friendlies

Competitions

Overview

La Liga

League table

Results summary

Results by round

Matches

Copa del Rey

First round

Statistics

Goalscorers

References

External links 

Real Sociedad seasons
Real Sociedad